Italy competed at the 1988 Summer Olympics in Seoul, South Korea. 253 competitors, 212 men and 41 women, took part in 140 events in 23 sports.

Medalists

Competitors
The following is the list of number of competitors in the Games.

Archery

Giancarlo Ferrari, competing in his fifth Olympic archery contest, dropped to 33rd place in the field.  Fellow veteran Ilario Di Buò advanced to the quarterfinal, nearly missing a semifinal berth.  The Italians also just missed the cutoff for the final by one ranking in the team round.

Men's Individual Competition:
 Ilario Di Buò – Quarterfinal (→ 13th place)
 Andrea Parenti – Preliminary Round (→ 28th place)
 Giancarlo Ferrari – Preliminary Round (→ 33rd place)

Men's Team Competition:
 Di Buo, Parenti, and Ferrari – Semifinal (→ 9th place)

Athletics

Men's 10,000 metres 
 Salvatore Antibo 
 First Round — 28:09.35
 Final — 27:23.55 (→  Silver Medal)

 Alberto Cova 
 First Round — 28:43.84 (→ did not advance)

Men's Marathon 
 Gelindo Bordin 
 Final — 2"10:32 (→  Gold Medal)

 Orlando Pizzolato 
 Final — 2"15:20 (→ 16th place)

 Gianni Poli 
 Final — 2"16:07 (→ 19th place)

Men's 3,000 m Steeplechase
 Alessandro Lambruschini
 Heat — 8:32.59 
 Semi Final — 8:16.92
 Final — 8:12.17 (→ 4th place)

 Francesco Panetta
 Heat — 8:29.75 
 Semi Final — 8:17.23
 Final — 8:17.79 (→ 9th place)

Men's Hammer Throw
 Lucio Serrani
 Qualifying Heat — 70.50m (→ did not advance)

Men's Shot Put
 Alessandro Andrei
 Qualifying Heat – 20.18m
 Final – 20.36m (→ 7th place)

Men's Long Jump 
 Giovanni Evangelisti 
 Qualification — 7.81m
 Final — 8.08m (→ 4th place)

Men's 20 km Walk
 Maurizio Damilano
 Final — 1:20:14 (→  Bronze  Medal)

 Giovanni De Benedictis
 Final — 1:20:14 (→ 6th place)

 Carlo Mattioli
 Final — 1:22:58 (→ 19th place)

Men's 50 km Walk
 Raffaello Ducceschi
 Final — 3'45:43 (→ 8th place)

 Giovanni Perricelli
 Final — 3'47:14 (→ 11th place)

 Sandro Bellucci
 Final — 4'04:56 (→ 32nd place) 

Women's Marathon 
 Laura Fogli 
 Final — 2"27.49 (→ 6th place)

 Maria Curatolo 
 Final — 2"30.14 (→ 8th place)
 
 Antonella Bizioli 
 Final — 2"34.38 (→ 23rd place)

Boxing

Men's Flyweight (– 51 kg) 
 Andrea Mannai
 First Round — Lost to Arthur Johnson (USA), 0:5

Men's Featherweight
 Giovanni Parisi

Men's Lightweight
 Giorgio Campanella

Men's Light-Middleweight
 Vincenzo Nardiello

Men's Middleweight
 Michele Mastrodonato

Men's Light-Heavyweight
 Andrea Magi

Men's Heavyweight
 Luigi Gaudiano

Canoeing

Cycling

Eighteen cyclists, fourteen men and four women, represented Italy in 1988.

Men's road race
 Roberto Pelliconi
 Fabrizio Bontempi
 Gianluca Bortolami

Men's team time trial
 Roberto Maggioni
 Eros Poli
 Mario Scirea
 Flavio Vanzella

Men's sprint
 Andrea Faccini

Men's individual pursuit
 Ivan Beltrami

Men's team pursuit
 Ivan Beltrami
 Gianpaolo Grisandi
 David Solari
 Fabrizio Trezzi
 Fabio Baldato

Men's points race
 Giovanni Lombardi

Women's road race
 Imelda Chiappa — 2:00:52 (→ 15th place)
 Maria Canins — 2:00:52 (→ 32nd place)
 Roberta Bonanomi — 2:00:52 (→ 45th place)

Women's sprint
 Elisabetta Fanton

Diving

Equestrian

Fencing

20 fencers, 15 men and 5 women, represented Italy in 1988.

Men's foil
 Stefano Cerioni
 Mauro Numa
 Andrea Borella

Men's team foil
 Andrea Borella, Stefano Cerioni, Federico Cervi, Andrea Cipressa, Mauro Numa

Men's épée
 Sandro Cuomo
 Stefano Pantano
 Angelo Mazzoni

Men's team épée
 Stefano Bellone, Andrea Bermond Des Ambrois, Sandro Cuomo, Angelo Mazzoni, Stefano Pantano

Men's sabre
 Giovanni Scalzo
 Gianfranco Dalla Barba
 Marco Marin

Men's team sabre
 Giovanni Scalzo, Marco Marin, Gianfranco Dalla Barba, Ferdinando Meglio, Massimo Cavaliere

Women's foil
 Margherita Zalaffi
 Dorina Vaccaroni
 Annapia Gandolfi

Women's team foil
 Dorina Vaccaroni, Margherita Zalaffi, Francesca Bortolozzi-Borella, Lucia Traversa, Annapia Gandolfi

Football

Men's Team Competition
Preliminary round (group B) 
 Defeated Guatemala (5-2)
 Lost to Zambia (0-4)
 Defeated Iraq (2-0)
Quarterfinals 
 Defeated Sweden (2-1)
Semifinals
 Lost to Soviet Union (2-3)
Bronze Medal Match 
 Lost to West Germany (0-3)

Team roster

 Stefano Tacconi (gk)  
 Roberto Cravero 
 Andrea Carnevale 
 Luigi De Agostini 
 Ciro Ferrara 
 Mauro Tassotti 
 Angelo Colombo 
 Luca Pellegrini 
 Massimo Brambati 
 Stefano Carobbi   
 Massimo Crippa 
 Giuliano Giuliani
 Paolo Virdis
 Ruggiero Rizzitelli
 Roberto Galia  
 Giuseppe Iachini 
 Stefano Desideri  
 Massimo Mauro 
 Alberigo Evani 
 Gianluca Pagliuca (gk)  
Head coach: Francesco Rocca

Gymnastics

Judo

Modern pentathlon

Three male pentathletes represented Italy in 1988. Carlo Massullo won an individual silver and the team won silver too.

Men's Individual Competition:
 Carlo Massullo – 5379 pts (→  Silver Medal)
 Daniele Masala – 5152 pts (→ 10th place)
 Gianluca Tiberti – 5040 pts (→ 17th place)

Men's Team Competition:
 Massullo, Masala, and Tiberti – 15571pts (→  Silver Medal)

Rhythmic gymnastics

Rowing

Sailing

Shooting

Swimming

Men's 100 m Freestyle
 Roberto Gleria
 Heat – 50.97 (→ did not advance, 18th place)

Men's 200 m Freestyle
 Roberto Gleria
 Heat – 1:49.51
 B-Final – 1:49.28 (→ 9th place)

 Giorgio Lamberti
 Heat – 1:50.47
 B-Final – scratched (→ did not advance, no ranking)

Men's 400 m Freestyle
 Giorgio Lamberti
 Heat – 3:53.29
 B-Final – scratched (→ did not advance, no ranking)

 Roberto Gleria
 Heat – 3:56.33 (→ did not advance, 19th place)

Men's 1500 m Freestyle
 Luca Pellegrini
 Heat – 15:18.80 (→ did not advance, 10th place)

 Stefano Battistelli
 Heat – 15:36.54 (→ did not advance, 20th place)

Men's 100 m Backstroke
 Valerio Giambalvo
 Heat – 59.48 (→ did not advance, 37th place)

Men's 200 m Backstroke
 Stefano Battistelli
 Heat – 2:03.63
 B-Final – scratched (→ did not advance, no ranking)

Men's 100 m Breaststroke
 Gianni Minervini
 Heat – 1:02.86
 Final – 1:02.93 (→ 7th place)

Men's 100 m Butterfly
 Leonardo Michelotti
 Heat – 55.83 (→ did not advance, 22nd place)

 Valerio Giambalvo
 Heat – 56.57 (→ did not advance, 28th place)

Men's 200 m Individual Medley
 Luca Sacchi
 Heat – 2:05.45
 B-Final – 2:05.68 (→ 13th place)

 Roberto Cassio
 Heat – 2:05.88 (→ did not advance, 18th place)

Men's 400 m Individual Medley
 Stefano Battistelli
 Heat – 4:20.43
 Final – 4:18.01 (→  Bronze Medal)

 Luca Sacchi
 Heat – 4:23.37
 Final – 4:23.23 (→ 7th place)

Men's 4 × 100 m Freestyle Relay
 Fabrizio Rampazzo, Giorgio Lamberti, Andrea Ceccarini, and Roberto Gleria
 Heat – 3:23.35
 Roberto Gleria, Giorgio Lamberti, Fabrizio Rampazzo, and Andrea Ceccarini
 Final – 3:22.93 (→ 8th place)

Men's 4 × 200 m Freestyle Relay
 Massimo Trevisan, Fabrizio Rampazzo, Valerio Giambalvo, and Roberto Gleria
 Heat – 7:21.85
 Roberto Gleria, Giorgio Lamberti, Massimo Trevisan, and Valerio Giambalvo
 Final – 7:16.00 (→ 5th place)

Men's 4 × 100 m Medley Relay
 Valerio Giambalvo, Gianni Minervini, Leonardo Michelotti, and Roberto Gleria
 Heat – 3:52.06 (→ did not advance, 15th place)

Women's 100 m Freestyle
 Silvia Persi
 Heat – 58.22 (→ did not advance, 29th place)

Women's 200 m Freestyle
 Silvia Persi
 Heat – 2:04.40 (→ did not advance, 23rd place)

Women's 400 m Freestyle
 Manuela Melchiorri
 Heat – 4:15.40
 B-Final – 4:14.90 (→ 14th place)

Women's 800 m Freestyle
 Manuela Melchiorri
 Heat – 8:40.63 (→ did not advance, 12th place)

Women's 100 m Backstroke
 Lorenza Vigarani
 Heat – 1:03.96
 B-Final – 1:03.88 (→ 13th place)

 Manuela Carosi
 Heat – 1:04.69
 B-Final – 1:03.80 (→ 11th place)

Women's 200 m Backstroke
 Lorenza Vigarani
 Heat – 2:17.35
 B-Final – 2:18.69 (→ 13th place)

Women's 100 m Breaststroke
 Manuela Dalla Valle
 Heat – 1:11.25
 B-Final – 1:10.95 (→ 12th place)

Women's 200 m Breaststroke
 Manuela Dalla Valle
 Heat – 2:30.60
 Final – 2:29.86 (→ 8th place)

 Annalisa Nisiro
 Heat – 2:32.77
 B-Final – 2:31.19 (→ 12th place)

Women's 100 m Butterfly
 Ilaria Tocchini
 Heat – 1:02.07
 B-Final – 1:02.78 (→ 16th place)

 Emanuela Viola
 Heat – 1:03.91 (→ did not advance, 24th place)

Women's 200 m Individual Medley
 Roberta Felotti
 Heat – 2:19.62
 B-Final – 2:19.63 (→ 13th place)

 Manuela Dalla Valle
 Heat – 2:22.85 (→ did not advance, 25th place)

Women's 400 m Individual Medley
 Roberta Felotti
 Heat – 4:49.20
 B-Final – 4:49.53 (→ 9th place)

Women's 4 × 100 m Medley Relay
 Lorenza Vigarani, Manuela Dalla Valle, Ilara Tocchini, and Silvia Persi
 Heat – 4:14.68
 Final – 4:13.85 (→ 8th place)

Table tennis

Tennis

Men's Singles Competition
 Paolo Canè
 First round — Defeated Milan Šrejber (Czechoslovakia) 6-3 7-6 4-6 6-3
 Second round — Defeated Emilio Sánchez (Spain) 7-5 6-3 6-7 6-4
 Third round — Defeated Javier Sánchez (Spain) 7-6 4-6 6-1 6-2
 Quarterfinals — Lost to Stefan Edberg (Sweden) 1-6 5-7 4-6

 Diego Nargiso
 First round — Defeated Francisco Maciel (Mexico) 4-6 2-6 7-6 7-6 8-6
 Second round — Lost to Tim Mayotte (United States) 6-2 2-6 4-6 0-6

 Omar Camporese
 First round — Lost to Guy Forget (France) 2-6 0-6 3-6

Women's Singles Competition
 Sandra Cecchini
 First Round – Bye 
 Second Round – Lost to Chris Evert (USA) 2-6 2-6

 Raffaella Reggi
 First Round – Defeated Liz Smylie (Australia) 7-6 6-0
 Second Round – Defeated Claudia Kohde-Kilsch (West Germany) 4-6 7-6 6-3 
 Third Round – Defeated Chris Evert (USA) 2-6 6-4 6-1 
 Quarterfinals – Lost to Manuela Maleeva (Switzerland) 3-6 4-6

Volleyball

Men's team competition
Preliminary round (group A)
 Lost to Brazil (0-3)
 Lost to Bulgaria (0-3)
 Defeated Sweden (3-2)
 Lost to Soviet Union (1-3)
 Defeated South Korea (3-0)
Classification Matches
 9th/12th place: Defeated Tunisia (3-0)
 9th/10th place: Defeated Japan (3-2) → Ninth place

Team roster
Andrea Gardini
Andrea Giani
Pierpaolo Lucchetta
Ferdinando De Giorgi
Marco Bracci
Claudio Galli
Lorenzo Bernardi
Alessandro Lazzeroni
Massimo Castagna
Andrea Zorzi
Luca Cantagalli
Andrea Lucchetta
Head coach: Carmelo Pittera

Water polo

Men's Team Competition
 Preliminary round (group A)
 Drew with Soviet Union (9-9)
 Defeated South Korea (1-11)
 Defeated Australia (7-5)
 Lost to West Germany (7-10)
 Defeated France (14-8)
 Classification Round (Group D)
 Drew with Hungary (9-9)
 Lost to Spain (9-11) → 7th place

 Team roster
 Paolo Trapanese
 Alfio Misaggi
 Andrea Pisano
 Antonello Steardo
 Alessandro Campagna
 Paolo Caldarella
 Mario Fiorillo
 Francesco Porzio
 Stefano Postiglione
 Riccardo Tempestini
 Massimiliano Ferretti
 Marco d'Altrui
 Gianni Averaimo
Head coach: Fritz Dennerlein

Weightlifting

Wrestling

References

External links
 

Nations at the 1988 Summer Olympics
1988
Olympics